Luis Alfredo Palacio González (born 22 January 1939) is an Ecuadorian cardiologist and former politician who served as President of Ecuador from 20 April 2005 to 15 January 2007. From 15 January 2003 to 20 April 2005, he served as vice president, after which he was appointed to the presidency when the Ecuadorian Congress removed President Lucio Gutiérrez from power following a week of growing unrest with his government.

Biography
Born in Guayaquil, Palacio is a physician by profession, specializing in cardiology. He studied in his home town and, later, at Cleveland, Ohio, doing residency at Case Western Reserve University, followed by a two-year cardiology fellowship at Barnes-Jewish Hospital and Washington University School of Medicine in St. Louis, Missouri, in the United States. He later lectured in cardiology and public health at the University of Guayaquil's faculty of medicine.

Palacio was chosen as Lucio Gutiérrez's running mate in the 2002 election. It was a common sight during the campaign to see Gutiérrez, dressed in his army fatigues, accompanied by Palacio, wearing surgical scrubs. Palacio had previously served as the minister for health during the administration of Sixto Durán Ballén. Many of the ministers he chose were from the Democratic Left (Ecuador).

One of Palacio's first proposals made as president was to hold a Constitutional Assembly to amend Ecuador's 1998 Constitution. For a period of several months prior to assuming office, he had been a critic of the Gutiérrez regime, saying that the country was "falling apart" and in need of "intensive care".

Rafael Correa was elected president in November 2006 and replaced Palacio as president on 15 January 2007.

Palacio is the Honorary Co-President of The International Academy of Social Sciences (Albany, Georgia, USA) together with H.E. Chavalit Yongchaiyudh, Former Prime Minister of the Kingdom of Thailand.

World Health Organization
Palacio was one of the candidates for the position of director-general of the World Health Organization, to be decided in a vote on 9 November 2006. However, on 18 October 2006, he announced he would not be pursuing the position, preferring to concentrate on his presidency until the last day of his mandate.

Approval rating 
Palacio began his presidency with an approval rating of 53%. Palacio left office with a 29% approval rating, according to a CEDATOS survey.

See also
 List of Case Western people
 Cesar Palacio, his cousin and a Toronto City Councillor
 Emilio Palacio, his brother and a persecuted journalist

References

External links
Presidencia de la República – Presidente Biography as president
BBC Mundo | América Latina | ¿Quién es Alfredo Palacio? (BBC News)
Ecuador's Balancing Act: Palacio, the People and the IMF  The Council on Hemispheric Affairs
 Explored - Recognize Your Power]
 Biography by CIDOB (in Spanish)

1939 births
Living people
People from Guayaquil
Ecuadorian cardiologists
Presidents of Ecuador
Vice presidents of Ecuador
Ecuadorian Ministers of Health